Arcobacter anaerophilus is a Gram-negative and non-motile bacterium from the genus of Arcobacter which has been isolated from sediment from the Gangasagar in India.

References

Campylobacterota
Bacteria described in 2013